Events from the year 2011 in Sweden

Incumbents
 Monarch – Carl XVI Gustaf
 Prime Minister – Fredrik Reinfeldt

Events
23 September: Annie Lööf is appointed chairperson of the Swedish Centre Party, succeeding Maud Olofsson.

Deaths

 5 January – Assar Rönnlund, cross-country skier (born 1935). 
 14 January – Sun Axelsson, novelist (born 1935)
 26 January – Tore Sjöstrand, runner (born 1921).
 4 February – Lena Nyman, actress (born 1944)
 3 March – Lasse Eriksson, comedian (born 1949)
 5 March – Eivor Alm, cross-country skier (born 1924).
 10 March – Valter Nyström, runner (born 1915).
 24 March – Stig Berntsson, sport shooter (born 1930).
 7 May – Eilert Määttä, ice hockey player (born 1935).
 30 May – Ricky Bruch, discus thrower (born 1946).
 12 July – Kurt Lundquist, sprinter (born 1925).
 8 August – Kurt Johansson, sport shooter (born 1914).
 2 September – Lennart Magnusson, fencer (born 1924).
 7 September – Stefan Liv, ice hockey player (born 1980)
 1 October – Sven Tumba, ice hockey player (born 1931).
 2 November – Sickan Carlsson, actress (born 1915)
 15 November – Ingrid Sandahl, gymnast (born 1924).

See also
 2011 in Swedish television

References

 
Years of the 21st century in Sweden
Sweden
Sweden
2010s in Sweden